Thomas Lehne Olsen (born 29 June 1991) is a Norwegian professional footballer who plays as a striker for Eliteserien club Lillestrøm.

Club career
Lehne Olsen made his debut for HamKam on 14 April 2009 against Alta, they won the game 7–0. He made his debut for Strømsgodset on 24 May 2013 against Aalesund, they won the game 2–1.

On 6 August 2014, he struck a loan deal with Ull/Kisa for the remainder of the 2014 season.

In December 2015, Lehne Olsen signed a contract with Tromsø. After two seasons at Tromsø, he signed a four-year contract with Lillestrøm on 12 February 2018.

International career
He made his debut for Norway national football team on 16 November 2021 in a World Cup qualifier against the Netherlands.

Career statistics

Club

Honours
Strømsgodset
 Tippeligaen: 2013

References

1991 births
Living people
Norwegian footballers
Norwegian expatriate footballers
Norway youth international footballers
Norway under-21 international footballers
Norway international footballers
Association football forwards
Hamarkameratene players
Strømsgodset Toppfotball players
Ullensaker/Kisa IL players
Tromsø IL players
Lillestrøm SK players
Shabab Al-Ahli Club players
Norwegian First Division players
Norwegian Second Division players
Eliteserien players
UAE Pro League players
Expatriate footballers in the United Arab Emirates
Norwegian expatriate sportspeople in the United Arab Emirates